Dermestes is a genus of beetles in the family Dermestidae, the skin beetles. The genus is distributed worldwide.

The larvae of these beetles feed on dead and dried animal material, including dead bodies, dried meat and fish, and body parts such as bone, hair, skin, and feathers. They are cannibalistic on occasion. They are pests of museums, where they feed on specimens such as dried insects and stuffed animals. They may be useful in museum settings as well, where they are used to clean tissue from skeletons. Some species may play a role in forensic entomology when they are found on human corpses.

As of 2013 there are about 92 species.

Species
 Dermestes affinis Sturm, 1843
 Dermestes argentinus Herrmann & Háva, 2013
 Dermestes ater DeGeer, 1774
 Dermestes aurichalceus Küster, 1846
 Dermestes avidus Christofori & Jan, 1832
 Dermestes bicolor Fabricius, 1781
 Dermestes boliviensis Háva & Kalík, 2005
 Dermestes caninus Germar, 1824
 Dermestes canus Sturm, 1843
 Dermestes carnivorus Fabricius, 1775
 Dermestes castaneus Thunberg, 1794
 Dermestes cinereus Dahl, 1823
 Dermestes coarctatus Harold, 1877
 Dermestes coronatus Steven in Schönherr, 1808
 Dermestes depressus Gebler, 1830
 Dermestes destructor Christofori & Jan, 1832
 Dermestes dimidiatus Boeber, 1802
 Dermestes elegans Gebler, 1830
 Dermestes elongatissimus Pic, 1916
 Dermestes elongatus Dejean, 1837
 Dermestes erichsoni Ganglbauer, 1904
 Dermestes fasciatus LeConte, 1854
 Dermestes fasciventris Reitter, 1881
 Dermestes flavicornis Schneider, 1785
 Dermestes floricola Melsheimer, 1806
 Dermestes freudei Kalík & Ohbayashi, 1982
 Dermestes frischii Kugelann, 1792
 Dermestes fuliginosus Rossi, 1792
 Dermestes fulvicollis Reitter, 1881
 Dermestes gerstaeckeri Dalla Torre, 1911
 Dermestes gyllenhalii Laporte, 1840
 Dermestes haemorrhoidalis Küster, 1852
 Dermestes hankae Háva, 1999
 Dermestes hirticollis Fabricius, 1792
 Dermestes hispanicus Kalík, 1952
 Dermestes impressipennis Pic, 1942
 Dermestes insulanus Schneider, 1785
 Dermestes intermedius Kalík, 1951
 Dermestes kafkai Háva & Kalík, 1999
 Dermestes kaszabi Kalík, 1950
 Dermestes laniarius Illiger, 1802
 Dermestes laosensis Háva, 2004
 Dermestes lardarius Linnaeus, 1758
 Dermestes larvalis Cockerell, 1917
 Dermestes latissimus Bielz, 1850
 Dermestes lectulalius Goeze, 1777
 Dermestes leechi Kalík, 1952
 Dermestes leopardinus Mulsant & Godart, 1855
 Dermestes linearis Rossi, 1788
 Dermestes loebli Háva, 2002
 Dermestes maculatus DeGeer, 1774
 Dermestes madagascariensis Lepesme, 1939
 Dermestes marmoratus Knoch in Melsheimer, 1806
 Dermestes marocanus Háva, 1999
 Dermestes maximus Pic, 1915
 Dermestes murinus Linnaeus, 1758
 Dermestes nan Háva, 2002
 Dermestes nebulosus Melsheimer, 1806
 Dermestes nidum Arrow, 1915
 Dermestes niger Melsheimer, 1806
 Dermestes normandi Kalík, 1951
 Dermestes oblongus Sturm, 1843
 Dermestes obscurus Sturm, 1843
 Dermestes olivieri Lepesme, 1939
 Dermestes palmi Sjöberg, 1950
 Dermestes pardalis Billberg in Schönherr, 1808
 Dermestes patagoniensis Háva & Kalík, 2005
 Dermestes pauper Heer, 1847
 Dermestes persimilis Crotch, 1873
 Dermestes peruvianus Laporte, 1840
 Dermestes planus Mroczkowski, 1960
 Dermestes progenior Zhantiev, 2006
 Dermestes pulcher LeConte, 1854
 Dermestes rapax Christofori & Jan, 1832
 Dermestes rattus LeConte, 1854
 Dermestes reductus Kalík, 1952
 Dermestes roubali (Kalík, 1951)
 Dermestes ruficornis Sturm, 1843
 Dermestes rufofuscus Solier, 1849
 Dermestes sardous Küster, 1846
 Dermestes schneideri Háva, 2002
 Dermestes semistriatus Boheman, 1851
 Dermestes serraticornis Thunberg, 1787
 Dermestes shaanxiensis Cao, 1987
 Dermestes sibiricus Erichson, 1848
 Dermestes sichuanicus Háva, 1999
 Dermestes signatus LeConte, 1874
 Dermestes solskyi Dalla Torre, 1911
 Dermestes spadiceus elsheimer, 1806
 Dermestes spinipennis Christofori & Jan, 1832
 Dermestes sturmi Christofori & Jan, 1832
 Dermestes subaenescens Pic, 1943
 Dermestes szekessyi Kalík, 1950
 Dermestes talpinus Mannerheim, 1843
 Dermestes teretiusculus Schneider, 1785
 Dermestes tertiarius Wickham, 1912
 Dermestes tessellatocollis Motschulsky, 1860
 Dermestes undulatus Brahm, 1790
 Dermestes vetustus Zhantiev, 2006
 Dermestes viridanus Melsheimer, 1806
 Dermestes viridis Schneider, 1785
 Dermestes voi Háva, 2000
 Dermestes vorax Motschulsky, 1860
 Dermestes wittei Kalík, 1955

References

External links
 on the UF / IFAS Featured Creatures Web site
 Dermestes ater, black larder beetle
 Dermestes maculatus, hide beetle